The 1994 Australian Drivers' Championship was a CAMS sanctioned motor racing competition open to drivers of racing cars complying with CAMS Formula Brabham (formerly known as Formula Holden) regulations. The championship winner was awarded the 1994 CAMS Gold Star as the Australian Champion Driver. It was the 38th running of the Australian Drivers' Championship and the sixth to feature the Formula Holden / Formula Brabham category which had been developed during 1988. The championship began on 17 April 1994 at Eastern Creek Raceway and ended on 28 August at Oran Park Raceway after six rounds.

The championship was won by Birrana Racing's Paul Stokell after a season long duel with Triple Eight Racing driver Greg Murphy. Murphy and his Ralt RT23 was the better combination at the start of the season, winning the first four races. Stokell started the year in a Reynard 90D, moving into the teams newer 91D at the second round. Stokell took his first win at Winton Motor Raceway and won every race bar one for the rest of the season to push past Murphy and win the championship.

Reynard 91D driver Adam Kaplan won the competition for third place in the championship on consistency, only finishing in the top three at the final race of the season with a second place at Oran Park. Tied for fourth place in the championship was Kevin Weeks (Reynard 91D) and Craig Lowndes in his first season in winged open-wheel racing cars. The emerging Formula Ford driver drove the ageing Cheetak Mk.9 owned by Brian Sampson with some impressive drives in the best of the aluminium constructed cars.

Teams and drivers

The following drivers competed in the 1994 Australian Drivers' Championship.

Results and standings

Race calendar
The 1994 Australian Drivers' Championship consisted of six rounds held in four different states. Each round consisted of two heats. The final round at Oran Park in Sydney used the shorter (1.96 km) South Circuit rather than the 2.6 km Grand Prix Circuit. Results sourced from:

Drivers Championship 
Points were awarded 20–16–14–12–10–8–6–4–2–1 based on the top ten race positions.

References

External links
 CAMS Manual reference to Australian titles at www.camsmanual.com.au > About CAMS > Titles – CAMS Gold Star

Australian Drivers' Championship
Drivers' Championship
Formula Holden